Feeling of Unity is the fourth studio album by Japanese electronicore band Fear, and Loathing in Las Vegas. It was released on 30 September 2015 through VAP. It is the last album to be released on this label.

Background and promotion
On 5 September, the band announced on their official site that they will release a new limited single on 7 January 2015 called "Let Me Hear". On 8 October, the short version of their new single premiered as the opening theme of the anime series Parasyte.

On 13 May 2015, the band released a new limited singles "Starburst" and "Struggle to Survive". A few days after the release of "Starburst", the band announced on their official site that they would be releasing their fourth studio album this autumn including the two main songs from their last two singles, "Starburst" and "Let Me Hear". On 12 August, the band released a new PV for the song "Cast Your Shell" which also was included to the album. On 16 August, they announced the title of the album.

Track listing

Personnel
Fear, and Loathing in Las Vegas
 So – clean vocals, backing unclean vocals, programming
 Minami – unclean vocals, rapping, keyboards, programming
 Sxun – lead guitar, backing vocals
 Taiki – rhythm guitar, backing vocals
 Kei – bass
 Tomonori – drums, percussion

Charts

Album

Singles

References

Fear, and Loathing in Las Vegas (band) albums
2015 albums